In mathematics, in the area of algebra known as group theory, a more than fifty-year effort was made to answer a conjecture of : are all groups of odd order solvable? Progress was made by showing that CA-groups, groups in which the centralizer of a non-identity element is abelian, of odd order are solvable . Further progress was made showing that CN-groups, groups in which the centralizer of a non-identity element is nilpotent, of odd order are solvable . For instance, a non-solvable CN-group G is such that its largest solvable normal subgroup O∞(G) is a 2-group, and the quotient is a group of even order.

Examples

Solvable CN groups include
Nilpotent groups
Frobenius groups whose Frobenius complement is nilpotent
3-step groups, such as the symmetric group S4

Non-solvable CN groups include:
The Suzuki simple groups
The groups PSL2(F2n) for n>1
The group PSL2(Fp) for p>3 a Fermat prime or Mersenne prime.
The group PSL2(F9)
The group PSL3(F4)

References

Finite groups
Group theory
Properties of groups